Hygrochloa aquatica, also known as Hall's grass, is a species of Poaceae found in Western Australia and the Northern Territory. It was present in the 2014 Catalogue of Life Annual Checklist.

References

Panicoideae